Dream Music – The Movie Music of Tangerine Dream is a 1993 compilation album by Tangerine Dream featuring material from three of soundtrack albums for the films The Park Is Mine, Deadly Care and Dead Solid Perfect.

Track listing
 "Victory" – 6:19 (from The Park Is Mine)
 "The Hospital" – 5:42 (from Deadly Care)
 "The Letter" – 5:18 (from The Park Is Mine)
 "Taking Central Park" – 3:20 (from The Park Is Mine)
 "Suite From Dead Solid Perfect" – 46:12 (from Dead Solid Perfect)
 "The Helicopter Attack" – 4:40 (from The Park Is Mine)
 "Clean And Sober" – 4:57 (from Deadly Care)

References

1993 compilation albums
Soundtrack compilation albums
Tangerine Dream compilation albums